The Netherlands Football League Championship 1906–1907 was contested by seventeen teams participating in two divisions. The national champion would be determined by a play-off featuring the winners of the eastern and western football division of the Netherlands. HVV Den Haag won this year's championship by beating PW 5-3 and 4–1.

New entrant
Eerste Klasse East:
AFC Quick 1890 returned after two seasons of absence

Divisions

Eerste Klasse East

Eerste Klasse West

Championship play-off

HVV Den Haag won the championship.

References
RSSSF Netherlands Football League Championships 1898-1954
RSSSF Eerste Klasse Oost
RSSSF Eerste Klasse West

Netherlands Football League Championship seasons
1906 in Dutch sport
1907 in Dutch sport